Metrosports  was an American sports syndication network. Founded in Rockville, Maryland in 1972, they produced television and radio broadcasts of sports games, primarily college football and basketball, for various local stations. In 1984, they were acquired by Total Communications Systems (TCS) and became TCS/Metrosports. After failing to make payments to sports conferences and losing rights deals, TCS/Metrosports filed for bankruptcy in 1985.

History
In 1972, Metrosports was incorporated under the name Metro Communications, Inc. in Rockville, Maryland. The company was founded by husband-and-wife Lenny Klompus and Marsha Cherner.

In 1984, the Washington Post called Metrosports "one of the nation's leading independent syndicators of college basketball games", citing its syndication deals with the Big East Conference and the Pacific-10 Conference.

After the U.S. Supreme Court made a decision in June 1984 voiding the NCAA's exclusive television contracts with CBS and ABC, schools and conferences were free to seek television deals with other broadcasters and syndicators. In the wake of this, Metrosports signed a $3 million rights deal with the Pacific-10 Conference. However, it only managed to pay $2.5 million, leading the Pac-10 to file suit for the remaining $500,000.

In April 1984, Metrosports was bought out by Total Communications Systems (TCS) and became TCS/Metrosports.

In August 1984, the athletic departments of Penn State, Notre Dame, West Virginia, Temple and Rutgers announced the formation of a National Independent Football Network in conjunction with TCS/Metrosports.

On January 31, 1985, the Big Ten Conference announced it was severing its rights deal with TCS/Metrosports due to non-payment.

On March 15, 1985, TCS/Metrosports filed for Chapter 11 bankruptcy.

References

American companies established in 1972
Entertainment companies established in 1972
Telecommunications companies established in 1972
American companies disestablished in 1985
Companies that filed for Chapter 11 bankruptcy in 1985
Television syndication distributors
Defunct film and television production companies of the United States
College sports television networks
1972 establishments in Maryland
Companies based in Rockville, Maryland